Ugia is a genus of moths in the family Erebidae erected by Francis Walker in 1858.

Species
Ugia albilinea Hampson, 1926
Ugia albooculata (Saalmüller, 1880) (Madagascar)
Ugia amaponda (Felder & Rogenhofer, 1874)
Ugia calescens (Holland, 1894)
Ugia cinerea (Holland, 1894)
Ugia disjungens Walker, 1858 (Borneo)
Ugia duplicata Gaede, 1940
Ugia duplicilinea Hampson, 1926
Ugia egcarsia (Bethune-Baker, 1911)
Ugia eugrapha Swinhoe, 1907 (Bali, Borneo, Java, Sumatra, Thailand)
Ugia flavida Gaede, 1940
Ugia geometroides (Holland, 1894)
Ugia hecate (Holland, 1894)
Ugia insuspecta Galsworthy, 1997
Ugia malagasy Viette, 1966 (Madagascar)
Ugia mascusalis (Walker, 1859)
Ugia mediorufa (Hampson, 1894)
Ugia minima Gaede, 1940
Ugia navana Viette, 1966
Ugia polysticta Hampson, 1926
Ugia radama Viette, 1966 (Madagascar)
Ugia radigera (von Heyden, 1891)
Ugia roseata Gaede, 1940
Ugia rufilinea Hampson, 1926
Ugia scopulina Hampson, 1926
Ugia serrilinea Hampson, 1926 (Borneo, Peninsular Malaysia, Sumatra, Sulawesi, Thailand)
Ugia sestia (Holland, 1894)
Ugia signifera Walker, [1863] 1864 (Borneo, Sumatra, Peninsular Malaysia)
Ugia stigmaphora Hampson, 1926
Ugia straminilinea Hampson, 1926
Ugia sundana Hampson, 1924 (Borneo, Java, Sumatra, Thailand)
Ugia taeniata (Holland, 1894)
Ugia transversa (Moore 1882) (India)
Ugia trigonalis Kobes 1982
Ugia umbrina (Holland, 1894)
Ugia violascens Gaede, 1940
Ugia viridior Holloway, 2005 (Borneo, Sarawak, Singapore)

Former species
Ugia affinis (Snellen, 1858)

References

 
Acantholipini
Moth genera